Verstak (Cyrillic: Верстак) is a gender-neutral Slavic surname. It literally means a workbench in several Slavic languages and may refer to
Dzmitry Vyarstak (born 1980), Belarusian football player
Tania Verstak (born 1942), Russian-born Australian model and beauty queen

Russian-language surnames